Louis Erard is an independent Swiss watch manufacturer that was founded in 1929. The company was founded by Louis Erard and André Perret and produced its first watches in 1931.

History 

Founded in La Chaux-de-Fonds as a watchmaking school in 1929, Louis Erard first sold watches under its brand in 1931l. In 1991, the company was sold and production moved to Le Noirmont. By 2003, the company was sold again and relaunched. Using mechanical movements from Sellita and Valjoux, Louis Erard has shipped over 200,000 watches from Le Noirmont, including collaborations with Leeds United Football Club and Ultima Sports sports cars.
Louis Erard continues to make watches with a regulator layout. In this layout, the hour, minute and second hand all pivot around different points. This layout was designed in mid-18th century for master clocks to offer the most accurate time readings available.
In 2020 the brand contracted high-end watchmaker Vianney Halter who then designed "Le Regulateur" complication piece, which features amongst Louis Erard 'Excellence' watch collection.

Awards 

 2020: GPHG Challenge (nominated) Le Régulateur Louis Erard x Alain Silberstein

References

External links

Swiss watch brands
Privately held companies of Switzerland